David Plaza Romero (born 3 July 1970) is a Spanish former professional road bicycle racer, who competed in the team time trial at the 1992 Summer Olympics. He now works as a directeur sportif for UCI Women's Continental Team .

Major results

 1991
 1st, Overall, Vuelta a la Comunidad de Madrid
 1994
 1st, Overall, Vuelta a la Comunidad de Madrid
 1999
 1st, Overall, Volta a Portugal
 2000
 1st, Overall, Deutschland Tour
1st, Stage 7
 2nd, Individual time trial, National Road Championships
 2001
 1st, Overall, Vuelta de Chile
1st, Stages 6a & 8
 1st, Stage 3, Tour de Romandie

References

External links 

1970 births
Living people
Spanish male cyclists
Cyclists from Madrid
Cyclists at the 1992 Summer Olympics
Olympic cyclists of Spain
S.L. Benfica (cycling)
Volta a Portugal winners